Football Club de Sion, commonly known as simply FC Sion or Sion, is a Swiss football team from the city of Sion. The club was founded in 1909, and play their home matches at the Stade Tourbillon. They have won the Swiss Super League twice, and the Swiss Cup in 13 of their 14 appearances in the final, the most recent being in 2015. The first team of the club was also known as their incorporated name Olympique des Alpes SA.

History

FC Sion were founded in 1909 by Robert Gilliard, who became club captain, and played their first match the same year, a 3–2 win against FC Aigle. The club grew thanks to contributions from locals, and played their first competitive league fixture in 1914, again a 3–2 victory, against FC Monthey. In 1919, Sion formally organised its managerial structure, with Gilliard becoming vice-president and Charles Aymon taking the presidency.

From 1932, Sion played in the fourth tier of Swiss football, where they spent much of the next 20 years, briefly interrupted by promotion to the third tier in 1944, quickly followed by relegation in 1946. In 1952, Sion returned to the third tier. Five years later, Sion gained promotion again to the National League B, followed five years later by promotion to the National League A (now the Swiss Super League) in 1962. 1965 saw the first of Sion's Swiss Cup wins following a 2–1 victory over Servette.

The 16,263 capacity Stade Tourbillon was officially opened in August 1968, but the club was relegated in 1969. Sion returned to the National League A at the first attempt and secured a second victory in the Swiss Cup, winning 3–2 against Neuchâtel Xamax in 1974. Sion would go on to consistently perform well in the Swiss Cup, with victories in 1980 (against Young Boys), 1982 (against Basel), 1986 (against Servette) and 1991 (against Young Boys). This period of success also saw the renovation and expansion of the Tourbillon in 1989, and was crowned with Sion's first Swiss League Championship in 1992.

More success in the Swiss Cup followed, winning the tournament in three consecutive years from 1995 with victories over Grasshopper, Servette and Luzern. Their win against Luzern in 1997 secured Sion their only domestic double, having also won the Swiss League.

However, the club quickly fell into financial trouble, and having narrowly avoided bankruptcy due to its purchase by Gilbert Kadji, the club suffered relegation in 1999. Despite returning to the top division the following season, financial problems plagued the team, culminating in relegation in 2001, the departure of Kadji and a denial of a professional license in 2003. The club was saved by architect and former footballer Christian Constantin, and they were re-instated into the second division in October 2003.

Constantin spent the following seasons rebuilding the club, with the club going through 20 managers in the following eight years, including taking the role himself twice, in a bid to financially stabilize. He was rewarded in 2006 with promotion back to the Super League, as well as a victory in the Swiss Cup, becoming the first second-tier team to achieve this, with a 5–3 penalty shoot-out victory over Young Boys after a 1–1 draw.

Transfer ban saga
In 2008, controversy came to Sion when they signed Essam El Hadary, leading to a two-year "registration period" ban for Sion from June 2009, and an international playing ban for El Hadary for four months, due to El-Hadary still being under contract at his former club Al Ahly. Sion appealed this action, but the Federal Supreme Court of Switzerland confirmed the FIFA, DRC and Court of Arbitration for Sport (CAS) decisions in 2009 and 2010 respectively. However, the lengthy legal battle (including the temporary reprieve) meant the ban was only practically instituted beginning in the winter transfer window of the 2010–11 season.

Although gaining a place in the qualifying round of the 2011–12 UEFA Europa League by winning the previous season's Swiss Cup, Sion were excluded from the Europa League by UEFA after fielding ineligible players in their play-off victory against Celtic. On 2 September, the Swiss Football League (SFL) rejected the registration of one more player, Brian Amofa.

On 30 September 2011, the SFL decided to provisionally qualify the six new signings, namely Stefan Glarner, Billy Ketkeophomphone, Mario Mutsch, Pascal Feindouno, José Gonçalves and Gabri, to comply with the ongoing legal process. Sion also sued the SFL and UEFA respectively in the Tribunal Cantonal de Valais and the Tribunal in Vaud, however both actions were dismissed. The club's earlier appeal was dismissed by UEFA Appeals Body on 13 September. Sion also sued the SFL and UEFA in the CAS, but withdrew the former claim. The hearing of the latter claim was set on 24 November.

On 25 October, the Discipline Commission (fr: Commission de discipline) of SFL suspended all six players for five matches. It was reported that each player filed their legal claim in civil court instead of using the Swiss FA and CAS "sports court" system, which the ban was requested by FIFA. On 27 October, as a "provisional and super-provisional measures", UEFA invited Sion to a match schedule consultation once UEFA lost the legal battle.

On 31 October 2011, Sion sent a complaint to the European Commission. FIFA also won the legal battle in civil court in November. Previously, the civil court of Martigny and Saint-Maurice (both of the city of Valais) ordered FIFA to confirm the signing of those six players on 3 August, a consequence of lawsuit brought out by the players. On 16 November, FIFA and the SFL appeal was upheld in the Valais canton court.

On 15 December, the CAS upheld the complaints by UEFA, affirming its right to discipline Sion according to previous agreements. The CAS also lifted the provisional measures ordered by the Tribunal Cantonal of Vaud (Cour civile) on 5 October 2011. After the ruling, FIFA threatened to suspend Swiss national and club teams from international competition if Sion were not appropriately penalized for its ostensible rules violations. In late December 2011, the Swiss Football Association complied with FIFA's demands and penalized Sion 36 standings points (based on how many matches ineligible players were involved), moving the club to last place in the league standings and putting the club at risk of relegation if the ruling stood.

Sion finished the 2011–12 season in ninth place, which qualified them to the relegation matches against Aarau, whom they defeated 2–1 on aggregate to stay in the Swiss Super League. Without suffering their 36-point deduction Sion would have finished in the third place, which would have qualified them into the 2012–13 UEFA Europa League. Prior to the start of the 2012–13 season, they made a major coup by signing Gennaro Gattuso and Kyle Lafferty, both via free transfers. However, the club had a disappointing season which saw them change coaches three times before settling on Gattuso to finish the season, ending in third place.

Honours
Sion held the distinction of having never lost a domestic cup final, with 13 wins in 13 appearances in the Swiss Cup, until a defeat by Basel in the 2017 edition.

Swiss Super League
Champions (2): 1991–92, 1996–97
Swiss Cup
Winners (13): 1964–65, 1973–74, 1979–80, 1981–82, 1985–86, 1990–91, 1994–95, 1995–96, 1996–97, 2005–06, 2008–09, 2010–11, 2014–15

Stadium
Sion play their home matches at the multi-purpose Stade Tourbillon, which has a capacity of 14,500. It was originally constructed in 1968, and was renovated in 1989 and 2012. The club also has a training centre near its office in Martigny and a youth development center in nearby Riddes.

Players

Current squad

Out on loan

Former players

  Essam El Hadary
  Izzet Akgül
  Alex Song
  Roberts Uldriķis
  Gennaro Gattuso

Club officials

Historical list of coaches

 Vittorio Barberis (1947–49)
 Carlo Pinter (1949–51)
 Joseph Wuilloud (1951–52)
 Henri Humbert & Mathey (1952–53)
 Paul Allégroz (1953–54)
 Henri Humbert (1954–55)
 Jacques Guhl (1955–59)
 Frank Séchehaye (1959–61)
 Karl-Heinz Spikofski (July 1961 – March 63)
 Lev Mantula (March 1963 – July 67)
 Stojan Osojnak (July 1967 – Nov 68)
 Peter Rösch (Nov 1968 – July 70)
 Maurice Meylan (July 1970 – Sept 71)
 Miroslav Blažević (Sept 1971 – July 76)
 István Szabó (1976–79)
 Daniel Jeandupeux (1 July 1979 – 30 June 1980)
 Oscar Fulloné (1980–81)
 Jean-Claude Donzé (July 1981 – Jan 88)
 Péter Pázmándy (Jan 1988 – July 89)
 Yves Débonnaire (1989–90)
 Enzo Trossero (1990–92)
 Jean-Paul Brigger (1 July 1992 – 31 Dec 1992)
 Claude Andrey (Jan 1993 – July 93)
 Umberto Barberis (1 July 1993 – Oct 94)
 Jean-Claude Richard (1 Oct 1994 – 30 June 1995)
 Michel Decastel (1 July 1995 – 30 June 1996)
 Jean-Claude Richard (1 Aug 1996 – 30 Aug 1996)
 Alberto Bigon (10 Aug 1996 – 19 Oct 1997)
 Jean-Claude Richard (Sept 1, 1997 – 30 March 1998)
 Jochen Dries (March 1998 – Nov 98)
 Charly In-Albon (Nov 1998 – March 99)
 Olivier Rouyer (March 1999 – July 99)
 Roberto Morinini (1 July 1999 – 30 Nov 1999)
 Henri Stambouli (5 Jan 2000 – 14 July 2001)
 Laurent Roussey (1 July 2001 – 30 June 2002)
 Jean-Claude Richard (1 July 2002 – 30 March 2003)
 Charly Rössli (1 Jan 2003 – 30 June 2003)
 Didier Tholot (1 July 2003 – 3 Nov)
 Didier Tholot &  Guy David (Nov 2003 – 4 Jan)
 Didier Tholot,  Guy David & Ami Rebord (Jan 2004 – 30 June 2004)
 Admir Smajić (20 April 2004 – 30 June 2004)
 Christian Zermatten (1 July 2004 – 10 Aug 2004)
 Gilbert Gress (9 Aug 2004 – 27 March 2005)
 Gianni Dellacasa (27 March 2005 – 16 Oct 2005)
 Christophe Moulin (19 Oct 2005 – 1 May 2006)
 Néstor Clausen (1 July 2006 – 1 Oct 2006)
 Christophe Moulin (interim) (Oct 2006)
 Marco Schällibaum (6 Oct 2006 – 21 Nov 2006)
 Pierre-Albert Chapuisat (21 Nov 2006 – 19 Feb 2007)
 Alberto Bigon (19 Feb 2007 – 13 Dec 2007)
 Charly Rössli (18 Dec 2007 – 25 March 2008)
 Alberto Bigon (March 2008 – 8 May)
 Uli Stielike (1 July 2008 – 3 Nov 2008)
 Christian Constantin (interim) (Nov 2008 – 8 Dec)
 Christian Zermatten &  Umberto Barberis (24 Dec 2008 – 10 April 2009)
 Christian Constantin (interim) (April 2009)
 Didier Tholot (14 April 2009 – 21 May 2010)
 Bernard Challandes (1 July 2010 – 22 Feb 2011)
 Laurent Roussey (22 Feb 2011 – 23 April 2012)
 Rolland Courbis (interim) (2 April 2012 – 5 June 2012)
 Vladimir Petković (15 May 2012 – 2 June 2012)
 Sébastien Fournier (1 June 2012 – Sept 3, 2012)
 Michel Decastel (Sept 4, 2012 – 30 Oct 2012)
 Pierre-André Schürmann (30 Oct 2012 – 10 Dec 2012)
 Víctor Muñoz (1 Jan 2013 – 25 Feb 2013)
 Gennaro Gattuso (25 Feb 2013 – 25 March 2013)
 Luigi Riccio (interim) (1 March 2013 – 24 March 2013)
 Arno Rossini (26 March 2013 – 13 May 2013)
 Michel Decastel (15 May 2013 – 21 Oct 2013)
 Laurent Roussey (22 Oct 2013 – 11 Feb 2014)
 Raimondo Ponte (11 Feb 2014 – 5 Jun 2014)
 Claudio Gentile (5 Jun 2014 – 12 Jun 2014)
 Frédéric Chassot (12 Jun 2014 – 28 Sep 2014)
 Jochen Dries (28 Sep 2014 – 8 Dec 2014)
 Didier Tholot (17 Dec 2014 – 12 Aug 2016)
 Peter Zeidler (22 Aug 2016 – 25 Apr 2017)
 Sébastien Fournier (25 Apr 2017 – 15 Jun 2017)
 Paolo Tramezzani (15 Jun 2017 – 22 Oct 2017)
 Gabri García (25 Oct 2017 – 6 Feb 2018)
 Maurizio Jacobacci (6 Feb 2018 – 17 Sep 2018)
 Murat Yakin (17 Sep 2018 – 7 May 2019)
 Christian Zermatten (interim) (8 May 2019 – 30 June 2019)
 Stéphane Henchoz (1 July 2019 – 3 Nov 2019)
 Christian Zermatten (interim) (4 Nov 2019 – 31 Dec 2019)
 Ricardo Dionisio (1 Jan 2020 – 3 June 2020)
 Paolo Tramezzani (3 June 2020 – 7 Aug 2020)
 Fabio Grosso (25 Aug 2020 – 5 Mar 2021)
 Ugo Raczynski (interim) (5 Mar 2021 – 16 Mar 2021)
 Marco Walker (16 Mar 2021 – 8 Oct 2021)
 Paolo Tramezzani (9 Oct 2021 – 20 Nov 2022)
 Fabio Celestini (21 Nov 2022 – 3 Mar 2023)
 David Bettoni  (7 Mar 2023 – Present)

European record

Notes
Note 1: Celtic lodged protests over the eligibility of a number of the Sion players who participated in the two legs of the play-off round, which Sion won 3–1 aggregate (first leg: 0–0; second leg: 3–1). The UEFA Control and Disciplinary Body accepted the protests and decided to award both matches to Celtic by forfeit (3–0). As a consequence, Celtic qualified for the UEFA Europa League group stage.

References

External links

  

 
Football clubs in Switzerland
Association football clubs established in 1909
Sport in Valais
Sion, Switzerland
1909 establishments in Switzerland